The Greek navy functioned much like the ancient Greek army. Several similarities existed between them, suggesting that the mindset of the Greeks flowed naturally between the two forms of fighting. The Greeks' success on land easily translated onto the sea. Greek naval actions always took place near the land so they could easily return to land to eat and to sleep, and allowing the Greek ships to stick to narrow waters to out-maneuver the opposing fleet. It was not uncommon for ships to beach and battle on land as well. Developing new techniques for the revolutionary trireme, and staying true to their land-based roots, the Greeks soon became a force to be reckoned with on the sea during the 5th century. They were also one of the greatest armies/naval forces in ancient times.

Naval Tactics

Battle formations 
In open sea, the Greek navy would sail in an upside-down ship formation, led by the commander's ship. However, at first sight of enemy ships, the Greek navy would turn to starboard or port to form its line for battle. The battle line consisted of ships lined up side by side, facing the enemy. This abreast formation acted as both an offensive and defensive tactic. Offensively, it allowed the ancient ships' main weapon, the ram, to be easily accessible. With the entire fleet alongside each other, there were more rams available to attack the opponent. This formation also provided the Greek fleet with protection by shielding the most vulnerable parts of the ships, which were the sides and the stern.

The abreast formation was used in almost all of the naval battles, except during the Battle of Naupactus. During this battle, the Athenian navy was attacked before it could transition into its battle formation. This battle formation was also so successful for the Greek navy that their opponents began to utilize it as well. In order to continue being successful, the Greek navy had to create new tactics and technology to be able to conquer its opponents.

Diekplous 
The diekplous was an ancient Greek naval operation used to infiltrate the enemy's line-of-battle. The maneuver consisted of Greek ships, in line abreast, rowing through gaps between its enemy's ships. After the galley successfully crossed the opponent's line, the Greek ships would turn around and attack the susceptible side of the opponent's vessel.

Although the diekplous is considered to be one of the most effective maneuvers in naval warfare, it was only successfully used in three battles: Lade, Chios, and Side. One reason why the tactic became less useful was that enemies quickly developed defensive tactics against it. One way opponents countered the diekplous was by retreating their fleet into a tight circle with the prows of their ships facing outward. This defensive maneuver was known as the hedgehog counter-formation. The tight circle prevented the Greek navy from infiltrating its opponent's squadron because if the navy used the diekplous, the galley would be encircled by its enemy and rammed. This counter formation was used by Themistocles in the Battle of Artemisium.

Periplous 
Another naval tactic used by the ancient Greeks was the periplous. The periplous consisted of the Greek navy "sailing around" the enemy's line. Like the diekplous, the periplous purpose was to expose the enemy's stern for an easy ramming target. An example of this tactic is described by Thucydides during the second battle between the Athenians and Peloponnesians in the Gulf of Corinth. During this engagement, a single Athenian galley was being pursued by a Peloponnesian ship until the Athenian ship circled around a merchant ship and rammed the Peloponnesian vessel and sank her. The Athenian ship was successful in this maneuver because it was the faster of the two ships, which is a key element in the periplous.

 Ramming 
The ram on the trireme was the Greek navy's most successful weapon. Triremes were equipped with a large piece of timber sheathed in an envelope of bronze, located in the front of each ship. Although each ship had a ram, the ship needed to have a skilled crew to be successful with this tactic. The oarsman rowing the ship needed to accurately hit the target, and then be able to quickly dislodge the weapon before the enemy ship sunk. The usual target during this attack was the stern, where the steering oars were located, or the side of the ship where the rowing oars were. While the ramming itself may have caused only a few casualties to the enemy, the majority of the casualties occurred later as the vessel began to sink, forcing its crew into the water.

 Shearing 
During an attack using the ram, the crew also sheared the enemy. Shearing occurred when the oars of one ship collided with any part of the opposing ship. During the collision, the wooden paddles shatter and often skew the rower and the men surrounding him. In addition to maiming, if not immediately killing, the enemy, the attacker is given another advantage to ram the opponent. This opportunity occurs while the attacked vessel stops rowing to evaluate the strength of each side of oarsman, leaving it in a standstill. The temporarily inoperative ship becomes victim to more ramming and spearing attacks.

 Marines and archers 
Marines, or epibatai, were the secondary weapon for the Greek navy after the ram. During battles, marines were responsible for both attacking the enemy's ship, and preventing their own ship from being boarded. The number of marines on the trireme fluctuated based on each battle. For example, during the Peloponnesian War, there were 4 archers and 10 marines on the deck of a vessel. However, Cimon had forty marines aboard each ship during the battle of Eurymedon. The difference in numbers between these two battles is because commanders used the marines for different purposes based on the circumstance of the battles. If the battle was being fought in confined waters, there would be more marines on the trireme. The ships would require more marines because the constricted water would prevent the use of typical tactics, and would increase the risk of the ship being boarded by the enemy.

Archers were also important in naval battles. The arrows of the seagoing archers were deadly and efficient and could decrease the enemy’s fighting power considerably by picking off officers and men on the enemy ship. The arrows had an effective range of 160–170 meters. When fired from a ship executing a diekplous or a ramming blow, the arrows had a greater velocity.

 Land tactics 

 Hoplites 
Soldiers of the Greek army were called hoplites. They were known for their courage and strength. Stories like the Battle of Thermopylae demonstrate the strength and skill Greeks had in land battle. From the moment Greeks started fighting with "bronze shields and in the phalanx," they must have regularly been drawn up in rank and file and not just crowded together. They had a specific formation in order to execute all of their military maneuvers. The Athenian army was typically divided into ten taxeis, or tribal regiments, and subdivided into lochoi. These subunits worked as smaller pieces of an overall picture of military power. Trained thoroughly, the hoplites were as skilled at their melee combat as the Athenian oarsmen were at their precision ramming and rowing.

 Phalanx 
The phalanx was an army tactic the Greeks performed with shields. Each soldier carried a shield in his left arm, which he used to protect both himself and the man on his left. The depth of the phalanx differed depending on the battle and commander, but the width of the formation was considerably greater than its depth. For example, during the battle of Syracuse, the depth of the Athenian army's phalanx was 8 men, while its opponent, the Syracusan army, had a depth of 16 men.

 Melee 
Melee, or hand-to-hand combat, occurred most often after the tight formation of the phalanx dispersed. This fighting was also often referred to as dorarismos, meaning "spear-fighting" because the hoplites would use small swords in the fighting. One example of melee combat is described by Herodotus during a battle at Thermopylae. Herodotus reports that after the Spartans had lost their spears and swords during the dorarismos, they continued fighting "with their hands and teeth."

 Ambuscade 
An uncommon tactic of Ancient Greek warfare, during the hoplite battles, was the use of ambush. When light-armed forces began to be used, ambushing became a recognized scheme. The most known version of this tactic occurred during the Battle of Dyme in 218 BC, when one side pretended to retreat from the fighting and enticed their enemy to follow them into an ambush. This tactic became so well known that in 217 BC the Stratian army declined to pursue the Akarnanians during their retreat in fear that they would face an ambush.

 Notes 

E. English
 References 
 Adcock, F.E. (1957). The Greek and Macedonian Art of War. University of California Press. .
 Anderson, J.K. 1970. Military Theory and Practice in the Age of Xenophon. Berkeley: University of California Press.
 Anderson, J.K. 1969. Review of Greek Oared Ships 900-322 B.C. by J. S. Morrison. Classical Philology 64: 180-183.
 Casson, Lionel. 1991.  The Ancient Mariners: Seafarers and Sea Fighters of the Mediterranean in Ancient Times, 89-96. Princeton: Princeton University Press.
 Hanson, Victor Davis (2000). The Western Way of War: Infantry Battle in Classical Greece. University of California Press. .
 Holladay, A.J. 1988. "Further Thoughts on Trireme Tactics." Greece and RomeSecond Series 35: 149-151.
 Jordan, Boromir. 1975. The Athenian Navy in the Classical Period: A Study of Athenian Naval Administration and Military Organization in the Fifth and Fourth Centuries B.C. University of California Publications: Classical Studies 13. Berkeley and Los Angeles: University of California Press.
 Lazenby, J.F. (1987-10-01). "The Diekplous." Greece & Rome. Second Series 34(2): 169-177.
 Morrison, J.S. 1974. "Greek Naval Tactics in the 5th century BC." International Journal of Nautical Archaeology and Underwater Exploration 3: 21-26.
 Polybius (2011). The Histories.  Translated by W.R. Paton. Harvard University Press.
 Pritchett, W. Kendrick (1971). The Greek State of War 1. The University of California Press. .
 Pritchett, W. Kendrick (1974). The Greek State of War 2. The University of California Press. .
 Pritchett, W. Kendrick (1991). The Greek State of War 5. The University of California Press. (v.1).
 Rawlings, Louis (2007). The Ancient Greeks at War. Manchester University Press. .
 Strauss, Barry S. 2000. "Democracy, Kimon, and the Evolution of the Athenian Naval Tactics in the Fifth Century BC." In  Polis & Politics: Studies in Ancient Greek History, ed. By Pernille Flensted-Jensen, Thomas Heine Nielsen, and Lene Rubinstein, 315-326. Copenhagen: Museum Tusculanum Press, University of Copenhagen.
 Whitehead, Ian (1987-10-01). "The Periplous". Greece & Rome. Second Series 34' (2): 178–185.

Greco-Persian Wars
Navy of ancient Athens
Peloponnesian War